The 2010–11 RFU Championship was the 2nd season (of the professionalised format) of the second division of the English domestic rugby union competitions, played between August 2010 and May 2011.  New teams to the division included Worcester Warriors who were relegated from the Guinness Premiership 2009–10 and Esher who were promoted from the 2009–10 National League 1.  The league maintained the three stage system with the league including promotion/relegation pools and playoffs to determine the champion and promoted team.

Worcester Warriors topped the regular season league table, their play-off group table and then won the Championship after they defeated Cornish Pirates over two legs in the Championship final at Sixways Stadium (46-32) on 18 May 2011 to make an instant return to the Premiership. Birmingham & Solihull were relegated to the 2011–12 National League 1 at the end of this season.

Participating teams

Stage 1 league table

Results

Round 1

Round 2

Round 3

Round 4

Round 5

Round 6

Round 7

Round 8

Round 9

Round 10

Round 11

Round 12

Round 13

Round 14 

Postponed. Game rescheduled to 25 January 2011.

Postponed. Game rescheduled to 15 December 2010.

Round 15 

Postponed. Game rescheduled to 15 December 2010.

Postponed. Game rescheduled to 14 December 2010.

Postponed. Game rescheduled to 19 January 2011.

Postponed. Game rescheduled to 18 January 2011.

Round 14 & Round 15 (rescheduled games)  

Game rescheduled from 4 December 2010.

Game rescheduled from 27 November 2010.

Game rescheduled from 4 December 2010.

Round 16 

Postponed. Game rescheduled to 9 February 2011.

Postponed. Game rescheduled to 2 February 2011.

Round 17

Round 18 

This fixture would double up as a league and 2010–11 British and Irish Cup game after the corresponding cup game was postponed.

Round 15 (rescheduled games)  

Game rescheduled from 4 December 2010.

Game rescheduled from 4 December 2010.

Round 14 (rescheduled game)  

Game rescheduled from 27 November 2010.

Round 19

Round 16 (rescheduled game)  

Game rescheduled from 12 December 2010.

Round 20

Round 16 (rescheduled game)  

Game rescheduled from 12 December 2010.

Round 21

Round 22

Stage 2 - Play-offs

Group A (Promotion)

Round 1

Round 2

Round 3

Round 4

Round 5

Round 6

Group B (Promotion)

Round 1

Round 2

Round 3

Round 4

Round 5

Round 6

Group C (Relegation) 

 * Refers to number of points awarded before the start of the play-offs.

Round 1

Round 2

Round 3

Round 4

Round 5

Round 6

Stage 3

Semi-finals

Final

Total Season Attendances 

Includes playoff games.

Individual statistics 
Player stats include playoff games as well as regular season games.  Also note that points scorers includes tries as well as conversions, penalties and drop goals.

Top points scorers

Top try scorers

Season records

Team
Largest home win — 68 pts
81 - 13 Worcester Warriors at home to Bristol on 16 April 2011
Largest away win — 46 pts
68 - 22 London Welsh away to Moseley on 16 October 2010
Most points scored — 81 pts
81 - 13 Worcester Warriors at home to Bristol on 16 April 2011
Most tries in a match — 12 
Bedford Blues at home to Rotherham Titans on 16 April 2011
Most conversions in a match — 10 (x2)
Bedford Blues at home to Rotherham Titans on 16 April 2011
Worcester Warriors at home to Bristol on 16 April 2011
Most penalties in a match — 7 (x5)
Nottingham at home to London Welsh on 29 August 2011
Nottingham away to Doncaster Knights on 2 October 2011
Esher at home to Birmingham & Solihull on 1 January 2011
Rotherham Titans at home to Doncaster Knights on 5 February 2012
Plymouth Albion at home to Birmingham & Solihull on 25 March 2012
Most drop goals in a match — 3
Worcester Warriors away to Bedford Blues on 16 October 2010

Player
Most points in a match — 30
 James Pritchard for Bedford Blues at home to Rotherham Titans on 16 April 2011
Most tries in a match — 4 (x2)
 James Short for Bedford Blues at home to Moseley on 25 September 2010
 Josh Drauniniu for London Welsh away to Moseley on 16 October 2010
Most conversions in a match — 10
 James Pritchard for Bedford Blues at home to Rotherham Titans on 16 April 2011
Most penalties in a match —  7 (x5)
 James Arlidge for Nottingham at home to London Welsh on 29 August 2011
 James Arlidge for Nottingham away to Doncaster Knights on 2 October 2011
 Sam Ulph for Esher at home to Birmingham & Solihull on 1 January 2011
 Juan Pablo Socino for Rotherham Titans at home to Doncaster Knights on 5 February 2012
 Alex Davies for Plymouth Albion at home to Birmingham & Solihull on 25 March 2011
Most drop goals in a match —  3
 Andy Goode for Exeter Chiefs away to Bristol on 26 May 2010

Attendances
Highest — 12,024 
Worcester Warriors at home to Cornish Pirates on 18 May 2011
Lowest — 317 
Birmingham & Solihull at home to Doncaster Knights on 9 January 2011
Highest Average Attendance — 6,524
Worcester Warriors
Lowest Average Attendance — 590
Birmingham & Solihull

References

External links
 Official site
 Fixtures & Results

 
2010–11 in English rugby union leagues
2010-11